Sinotyrannus (meaning "Chinese tyrant") is a genus of large basal tyrannosauroid dinosaur, known from a single incomplete fossil specimen including a partial skull, from the Early Cretaceous Jiufotang Formation of Liaoning, China. Specifically, it is a member of the Proceratosauridae, a family that originated in the Jurassic whose members are known from Europe and Asia. Though it is not much younger than primitive tyrannosauroids such as Dilong, it is similar in size to later forms such as Tyrannosaurus. The type species is S. kazuoensis, described by Ji et al., in 2009.

Description 

It was among the largest basal tyrannosauroids known, repudiating the previously presumed trend that tyrannosauroids gradually increased in size throughout the Cretaceous period from small basal forms like Dilong to advanced apex predators such as Tyrannosaurus. The holotype, KZV-001, consists of a disarticulated partial skeleton including the front portion of the skull, three dorsal vertebrae, the incomplete ilia, three articulated manual phalanges (including an ungual), and other fragmentary bones.

The preserved cranial elements include the premaxillae, dentary, and anterior portions of the maxillae and nasals. The dorsal margin of the maxilla is unusually concave unlike the convex condition in tyrannosaurids. The nares are large and elliptical, supporting its relation to proceratosauridae. The dentary gradually curves upwards as it approaches its front edge. Many teeth are preserved attached to the maxillae, with a roughly equal number of denticles on each side, similarly to those of tyrannosaurids. Sinotyrannus could perceivably have had a tall nasal crest like other proceratosaurids, although not enough of its nasals are preserved to be certain.

The three preserved vertebrae have very tall neural spines. The proportions of the preserved manual phalanges support the idea that they belong to the second finger, and the ungual has a deep groove on each side. The ilia are mainly present as molds, with the mold of the external side of the left ilium being the most complete. The preacetabular blade is short and wide, with a massive pubic peduncle, while the postacetabular blade is longer and thinner, with a triangular ischial peduncle. These traits of the ilia differentiate it from more advanced tyrannosauroids such as the tyrannosaurids.

Classification
The original description of Sinotyrannus proposed that it could have been the earliest tyrannosaurid due to its large size, but subsequent analyses place it as a proceratosaurid tyrannosauroid. It is considered to be part of a clade containing Juratyrant and Stokesosaurus, as they all reputedly share a narrow preacetabular notch. A 2016 analysis instead placed Juratyrant and Stokesosaurus outside of proceratosauridae and proposed that Sinotyrannus is a sister taxon of Yutyrannus within proceratosauridae.

Below is a cladogram by Loewen et al. in 2013.

See also

 Timeline of tyrannosaur research

References

External links
Pieces of Sinotyrannus skull.
Diagram of pieces from Sinotyrannus.

Jiufotang fauna
Early Cretaceous dinosaurs of Asia
Proceratosaurids
Fossil taxa described in 2009